William Thurston's elliptization conjecture states that a closed 3-manifold with finite fundamental group is spherical, i.e. has a Riemannian metric of constant positive sectional curvature.

Relation to other conjectures
A 3-manifold with a Riemannian metric of constant positive sectional curvature is covered by the 3-sphere, moreover the group of covering transformations are isometries of the 3-sphere.
If the original 3-manifold had in fact a trivial fundamental group, then it is homeomorphic to the 3-sphere (via the covering map). Thus, proving the elliptization conjecture would prove the Poincaré conjecture as a corollary. In fact, the elliptization conjecture is logically equivalent to two simpler conjectures: the Poincaré conjecture and the spherical space form conjecture.

The elliptization conjecture is a special case of Thurston's geometrization conjecture, which was proved in 2003 by G. Perelman.

References
For the proof of the conjectures, see the references in the articles on geometrization conjecture or Poincaré conjecture.
 William Thurston. Three-dimensional geometry and topology. Vol. 1. Edited by Silvio Levy. Princeton Mathematical Series, 35. Princeton University Press, Princeton, NJ, 1997. x+311 pp. .
 William Thurston. The Geometry and Topology of Three-Manifolds, 1980 Princeton lecture notes on geometric structures on 3-manifolds, that states his elliptization conjecture near the beginning of section 3.

Riemannian geometry
3-manifolds
Conjectures that have been proved